Mini Shopaholic (2010) is the sixth book of Shopaholic series. It is a chick-lit novel by Sophie Kinsella, a pen-name of Madeline Wickham. It focuses on the main character Rebecca (Becky) Bloomwood, her husband Luke Brandon and their daughter Minnie.

Plot summary 

Rebecca Bloomwood and her husband, Luke Brandon, want to buy a home of their own so that they do not have to live with Becky's parents anymore. Their young daughter, Minnie, exhibits behavioural problems and seems to be incapable of being controlled by either parent. For example, she has been banned from four different Christmas grottos because of her naughty behaviour. Minnie's inability to behave properly gives Luke doubts about having a second child. He tells Becky that they are already having trouble controlling Minnie and he is unable to even contemplate having another child.

In addition to the difficulties of raising Minnie, Becky is also planning a surprise party for Luke. In her efforts to keep it a secret from Luke, she encounters several obstacles. At first, several of her friends and members of her family doubt Becky's ability to keep such a colossal secret and she faces the financial problem of throwing a grand party. This includes the hardships in a potential lawsuit between Luke's company and the Arcodas group (which Luke claims will just be a settlement), the excessive shopping (which Becky solves by giving up shopping for new clothes to wear the clothing she hasn't worn for months) and struggling to find a proper home for their family so they can finally move out of the Bloomwoods' house in Surrey. She must also deal with Elinor, Luke's biological mother, who wants to get to know her granddaughter, Minnie. Becky keeps her encounters with his mother a secret from Luke as they have a hard time getting along. She expressly misses Annabel, Luke's stepmother who was more of a real mother to him than Elinor. Yet Becky is starting to see their own behavior is resembling that of his birth mother, in that they're being cold in keeping Minnie away from her. Luke staunchly denies it, admitting he was offended for an insult Elinor made about Annabel before her death and the mistreatment that she gave Becky over the years.

Later on, Becky also faces estrangement from her own parents after an argument she has with them. One such argument involve a disagreement that she had with Graham and Jane while discussing Minnie's behavior. They both suspect that Becky is being selfish in not accepting responsibility for her own actions that lead to Minnie's bad behavior, which she denies. Graham and Jane also thinks she's interfering with their lives by inviting herself when they want privacy with each other. The three go days without talking to each other.

In a subplot, Jess and Tom have secretly gotten married in Chile. They are considering adopting their first child, but Janice is against it and insists they get a biological child first before adopting. She attempts to lace their drinks out with drug induced euphoria to get them to conceive a biological grandchild for her. The first attempt is a failure which Jess and Tom both tell Janice to mind her own business.

Becky is about ready to give up on the surprise birthday party, which is in shambles due to her problems with Minnie and her strained relationship with her parents. Elinor steps in and offers an unconditional gift, the one real mothers would've made and reconciles with her when she accepts responsibility for her actions. She is stunned that she would help her, but accepts it so Luke can have his birthday party. In a moment of vulnerability, Elinor apologizes for insulting Annabel and realizes she was more of a real mother to Luke than her. Becky reaches out for her help in finding the source of Minnie's behavioral problems and Elinor agrees to help her.

Still concerned over Minnie's naughty behavior and without consulting Becky, Luke hires Nanny Sue from her own T.V. show in secret to help them become better parents. After coming home, Becky finds out and is infuriated with him for not consulting her about it. Becky admits she had been talking to Elinor about similar behavioral problems with Minnie and this angers Luke. Before an argument can unfold, Nanny Sue makes a surprise assessment and identifies Luke's fears with having another child along with his own issues with his mother, Elinor. She also shocks both Luke and Becky that she was actually called in by Graham and Jane (Becky's parents). She had gone undercover with her own children to observe their behavior and Luke is relieved when she admits that he had nothing to do Minnie's bad behavior. However, Becky is nervous when Nanny Sue mentions that her parents asked her to confront their daughter as a favor to them. After observing her behavior at the toy store, Nanny Sue is convinced that she is responsible for Minnie's naughty behavior. Becky tries to defend herself by explaining that she tried to explain to their daughter that they couldn't afford to buy the expensive toy pony she wanted because of the financial problems they have. Nanny Sue makes it clear that she still caved in and in spoiling Minnie by giving her what she wanted, Becky played a main role to her bad behavior. She is the first person to ask Becky if she considered that she may have a shopping addiction. She tries to deny this, much to Nanny Sue's amusement, but Minnie's comments of items doesn't help dissuade the matter. Feeling betrayed by her own daughter, Becky finally admits to Nanny Sue that she does and everything else in the matter. She reveals it was because of her addiction to shopping, inability to take responsibility for herself and fighting with Minnie for an expensive toy pony she wanted, are the real reasons they had been banned from previous Christmas grottos. Becky realizes the woman she had been talking to at the mall had been Nanny Sue with children of her own. Nanny Sue suggests that she and Luke begins Minnie on a strict regime of discipline (similar to what Elinor had told Becky). She also suggests that Becky undergo "Shopaholics Boot Camp" and join a support group for shopaholics. Afterwards, Becky asks Luke to reconsider about having a second child and he does. They however must deal with the surprise birthday party along with the two million people who know about it and of which Becky had tried to keep a surprise.

Now reformed of her previous behavior, Becky reconciles with Graham and Jane and apologizes. When she learns about Janice's behavior in forcing Jess and Tom to have a natural child first, Becky is unhappy and defends their decision to adopt. She tells Janice not to interfere in their lives and be more open minded with their choice. Becky's words offends Janice as Tom is her son and mentions that she wants them to have a birth child first. However, Becky remains adamant in her stance because Jess is her sister and she respects both her and Tom's decision to adopt first. She bargains with Janice to ease up on trying to make Jess and Tom have a natural child first if she allows them to adopt their first child. She agrees to Becky's terms to do so. The book ends with Luke asking Becky if she would like to come to L.A with him for 3 months upon learning he's representing Sage Seymour.

Characters 
Becky Brandon
Luke Brandon
Suze Cleath-Stuart
Tarquin Cleath-Stuart
Graham and Jane Bloomwood: Becky's parents who suffers a falling out with her. It's later revealed that they called Nanny Sue in secret before Luke did to confront Becky as a favor due to their stress in her refusal to accept responsibility for herself in playing a role in Minnie's bad behavior. When Becky finally does, she apologizes to her parents for her behavior and reconciles with them.
Minnie Brandon: Luke and Becky's toddler daughter who is naughty. It's revealed by Nanny Sue she is acting that way due to Becky's selfish behavior and inability to accept responsibility when it's due.
Martin and Janice Webster
Jessica Webster(née Bertram): Becky's older half-sister who marries Tom in Chile. She and Tom plan to adopt their first child, but Janice is insistent they have a biological child first before adopting.
Tom Webster
Elinor Sherman: Luke's estranged mother whom didn't like Becky. After one more insult involving her and Annabel(Luke's deceased stepmother), he finally cut ties with his mother. She meets Becky in secret and asks to see Minnie. At first, she refuses to allow it because of an earlier insult Elinor made about her. Soon Becky starts to see how their behavior is resembling hers' and how it will affect Minnie later on. She tries to convince Luke to reconcile with Elinor, but he refuses because he was angry over an insult she made about Becky and Annabel. When she finally gives up on the surprise birthday party, Elinor steps in and offers her help. She reconciles with Becky who asks her for help in dealing with Minnie's bad behavior and of which she accepts.
Nanny Sue: The host of her hit TV series "Nanny Sue" whom Luke calls to deal with Minnie's bad behavior. However, she shocks both Luke and Becky with her surprise assessment and that Graham and Jane(Becky's parents) called her in before Luke did. She had gone undercover using her own children to observe theirs and Minnie's behavior. From her limited observations, Nanny Sue knew Becky was the guilty party and confronts her as a favor to her parents. After getting her to admit to her wrongdoing, Nanny Sue suggests they start Minnie on a strict regime of discipline(similar to what Elinor said) and that Becky must go to a support group along with Shopaholics' Boot Camp.

Shopaholic Series 
The Secret Dreamworld of a Shopaholic (2000) also published as Confessions of a Shopaholic (2001)
Shopaholic Abroad (2001) also published as Shopaholic Takes Manhattan (2002)
Shopaholic Ties The Knot (2002)
Shopaholic & Sister (2004)
Shopaholic & Baby (2007)
Mini Shopaholic (2010)
Shopaholic to the Stars (2014)

Novels by Madeline Wickham
Chick lit novels
Black Swan (imprint) books
2010 British novels